The American Association of Physician Specialists, Inc. (AAPS) is a 501(c)(6) not-for-profit organization founded in 1950, with headquarters in Tampa, Florida.  The AAPS was first organized to provide specialty certification for physicians who had obtained advanced training in various areas of medical specialty.  AAPS was the first organization of its kind to accept both M.D. and D.O. physicians as full members, in contrast to the American Board of Medical Specialties which was initially limited to those with a M.D.

Mission
AAPS' mission is to promote the art and science of medicine for the betterment of the public health, to advance the interests of physicians and their patients, to promote public health, to lobby for legislation favorable to physicians and patients, and to advance new and evolving areas of medical specialization through academic discourse. It also publishes the American Journal of Clinical Medicine (AJCM).

Academies
The AAPS oversees the following 20 medical academies:
 Administrative Medicine
 Anesthesiology
 Dermatology
 Diagnostic Radiology
 Disaster Medicine- American Academy of Disaster Medicine (AADM)
 Emergency Medicine- American Academy of Emergency Physicians (AAEP)
 Family Medicine Obstetrics
 Family Practice     
 Geriatric Medicine
 Hospital Medicine
 Integrative Medicine
 Internal Medicine
 Obstetrics and Gynecology
 Ophthalmology
 Orthopedic Surgery
 Plastic & Reconstructive Surgery       
 Psychiatry         
 Radiation Oncology
 Surgery
 Urgent Care

See also
 American Academy of Disaster Medicine
 American Board of Physician Specialties
 American Board of Medical Specialties

References

External links
 
 

Medical associations based in the United States
501(c)(6) nonprofit organizations
Medical and health organizations based in Florida